Courtleigh is a surname. Notable people with the surname include: 

Robert Courtleigh (1916–2004), American actor
William Courtleigh (1867 or 1869–1930), American actor
William Courtleigh Jr. (1892–1918), American actor